The Marshes is a   Local Nature Reserve south of Swallowfield in Berkshire. It is owned and managed by Swallowfield Parish Council.

The main part of this site is a former horse paddock which was planted with 1400  native shrubs and trees between 2004 and 2008. A pond and boardwalk were constructed in a small area of wet woodland.

There is access from School Road.

References

Local Nature Reserves in Berkshire
Swallowfield